John McKenna is a TV director and documentary filmmaker. He was born in St. Helens and has a history degree from the University of Leicester. He started his career in Television at ITV sport in 1995.

References

External links

Living people
Alumni of the University of Leicester
English documentary filmmakers
English television directors
ITV Sport
Year of birth missing (living people)